The Lawrence, founded 1881, is the third oldest high school newspaper and the newspaper of The Lawrenceville School. Published weekly, The Lawrence acts as a forum for the school community, both on and off-campus. It consists of 5 sections: news, opinions, arts, features, and sports, along with a weekly editorial.

Honors and awards
The Lawrence has won numerous awards over the years, including the Columbia Journalism Award in many consecutive years. In 2019, The Lawrence also won an editorial award from Youth Journalism International.

Notable alumni
 Peter Elkind '76, editor-at-large at Fortune Magazine, author of The Smartest Guys in the Room
 Bob Ryan '64, sportswriter for the Boston Globe and ESPN contributor
 Marcus Mabry '85, International business editor for The New York Times
 Scott Wilson, deputy national editor for the Washington Post, former chief White House correspondent.
 Nicholas Nehamas '07, investigative reporter for The Miami Herald, part of the team of Miami Herald investigative reporters that was awarded the 2017 Pulitzer Prize for Explanatory Reporting, former Lawrence Opinions Editor. 
 Joseph Tsai '82, Taiwanese-Canadian billionaire businessman, co-founder and executive vice chairman of Alibaba Group; former sports editor of The Lawrence.
 Michael Chae '86, Chief Financial Officer of Blackstone; former editor-in-chief of The Lawrence.

See also
The Exonian
The Phillipian

References

External links
 

High school newspapers published in the United States
Student newspapers published in New Jersey